Slatten House, also known as Slatten Thousand Acres, is a historic home located near Bethany, Harrison County, Missouri.  It was built in 1856, and is a two-story, five bay, "T"-plan, Italianate style frame dwelling. A remodeling project added a belvedere atop the hipped roof during the latter part of the 19th century.  The surrounding property includes free flowing springs that feed into cement water troughs, virgin timber and the remnants of virgin prairie, and archaeological remains.

It was listed on the National Register of Historic Places in 1984.

References

Houses on the National Register of Historic Places in Missouri
Italianate architecture in Missouri
Houses completed in 1856
Buildings and structures in Harrison County, Missouri
National Register of Historic Places in Harrison County, Missouri